Losna is a lake which lies in the municipalities of Ringebu and Øyer in Innlandet county, Norway. Losna is a part of the Gudbrandsdalslågen river, which is in this region so broad and runs so slowly that this stretch is recognized as a lake. The European route E6 highway and the Dovrebanen railway line both run along the shores of the lake.

See also
List of lakes in Norway

References

Ringebu
Øyer
Lakes of Innlandet